Benjamin Norman Schultz (February 8, 1926 – August 22, 2020), known professionally as Allan Rich, was an American character actor.

Career
Rich began his acting career when he was nine years old. He appeared in the Broadway productions I'll Take the High Road (1943), Career Angel (1944), Darkness at Noon (1951), and The Emperor's Clothes (1953). In 1948, Rich played the title role in a production of Ben Jonson's Volpone in Yellow Springs, Ohio.

Beginning in 1979, Rich was distributor and publisher of Hollywood portraits made by George Hurrell.

Personal life and death 
Allan Rich was one of the many alleged communist sympathizers blacklisted in the 1950s Hollywood blacklist. He married Elaine in 1951, who would go on to be a personal manager to a number of actors after the couple moved to Los Angeles in 1976. The couple had two children together, Marian and David. Elaine Rich died in 2015, aged 81.

He mentored Rene Russo in acting.

Rich spent the last five years of his life as a resident at the Lillian Booth Actors Home, run by the Actors Fund of America. He died from progressive dementia in Englewood, New Jersey, in August 2020, at the age of 94.

Activism
Rich was the co-founder of non-profit organization We Care About Kids, which produces educational short films for middle and high school youths.

Filmography

References

External links 
 
 
 Personal website
 Personal Youtube page

1926 births
2020 deaths
20th-century American male actors
21st-century American male actors
American male film actors
American male television actors
Hollywood blacklist
Jewish American male actors
Male actors from New York City
People from the Bronx
Deaths from dementia in New Jersey
21st-century American Jews